Up with People (UWP) is an American 501(c)(3) nonprofit organization. Up with People stages song and dance performances promoting themes such as multiculturalism, racial equality, and positive thinking.

History

Archives 
The UWP Archives is housed at the University of Arizona Special Collections library. The archives include materials from the Up with People organization, the International Alumni Association, as well as the personal papers of the UWP Founder and Chairman Emeritus J. Blanton Belk and his wife Elizabeth "Betty" Belk. Select materials from the UWP archives are accessible on the Up with People digital collection hosted on the University of Arizona Special Collections website.

1960s 
UWP was born out of a split from Moral Re-Armament. In 1965, J. Blanton Belk dedicated his energies to creating an organization for young adults that enabled them to interact with the world through positivity and music. He created Up with People (UWP) to bring people together for the common good regardless of ideology, political affiliation, ethnicity, race, or religious affiliation. Up with People was officially incorporated as a "501(c)(3)   nonprofit, apolitical, non-sectarian international educational organization" in 1968 under the leadership of Belk.

1970s 
UWP traveled and performed their musical show across several countries. Notable events were performances at the Indianapolis 500, the Cotton Bowl, the White House, Super Bowl X, Belfast during the Troubles, and the People's Republic of China.

1980s 
UWP continued their musical tour, performing at Super Bowls XIV, XVI, and XX, the Jerash Festival, the Macy's Thanksgiving Day Parade, U.S. President George H.W. Bush’s inauguration in Washington, D.C., and Berlin to celebrate the fall of the Berlin Wall. This is also the first decade in which Up with People introduced a named show called Beat of the Future in 1985.

1990s 
UWP toured throughout the '90s, performing at events at the Washington Monument, Washington, DC; at the Freedom Festival in Philadelphia; the United Nations Conference on Environment and Development's Earth Summit; and the first Celebration of Peace event with Colin Powell in Denver, CO. This is also the decade UWP established formal partnerships with academic universities to begin offering academic credit through their program.

2000s 
UWP suspended touring operations temporarily at the end of 2000 until 2004, relaunching the program with a more academic focus and their current program aspects of travel, volunteer service, performing arts, and leadership development with the sub-brand Worldsmart Leadership Program. Two years after its relaunch, the sub-brand was removed, leaving the program branded solely as Up with People again. Notable touring appearances during the 2000s were the Macy's Thanksgiving Day Parade, the United Nations Culture of Peace Forum at the UN Headquarters, the 400th Anniversary of Bermuda, and the 119th Tournament of Roses Parade in Pasadena, California.

2010s 
UWP continued their program with a more comprehensive focus on travel, performance, volunteering, and leadership development. Notable performances during the 2010s were performing for Queen Silvia of Sweden at the Mentor Foundation Gala, Washington, DC; the 122nd Tournament of Roses Parade; and the 100th Anniversary of Kiwanis International in Indianapolis, Indiana. Camp Up with People was also started during this decade in 2011.

2020s 
Up with People hired former board of director's member and Lawyer Vernon C. Grigg, III as the president and CEO after the retirement of the previous CEO Dale Penny. Up with People was forced to suspend its tour for Cast A2020 two months in due to the global pandemic caused by COVID-19, which still remains to date. Grigg was succeeded by Seema Srivastava as CEO in 2022.

Super Bowl performances 

In the 1970s, Up with People began to make frequent appearances at the Super Bowl; the group performed in five Super Bowl halftime shows between 1976 and 1986 (with Grambling State University Marching Band being the only other group having that many returns to the Super Bowl halftime show with its six appearances), and performed at the pre-game show of Super Bowl XXV in 1991. By the 1990s, the style of halftime performance they helped define during the 1970s and 1980s (which centered on themed, musical-style spectacles which aimed to "fill the field") were frequently lambasted by critics for being too dated and not in touch with modern popular culture, leading organizers to shift toward popular musicians for future halftime shows.

UWP "On Tour" program
The On Tour program is open to participants ages 17–29. Each group, after training in Denver, travels to nearly 20 communities across two or three continents, per semester, spending about one week in each community. Each week, they live with a local host family, participate in service projects, learn about various cultures through educational workshops, and perform in Up with People's musical stage production. Programs begin in January or July of each year. The program is broken into the 4 main aspects of travel, volunteer service, performing arts, and education/professional development.

Related and affiliated organizations

Up with People International Alumni Association 
Up with People has an alumni group/professional networking organization that goes by the name: the Up with People International Alumni Association (UWPIAA). It was formed in 1988 and is also a 501(c)(3) nonprofit organization. The alumni body is composed of over 20,000 members from over 100 countries. They host a reunion event for previous travelers once a year.

Camp Up with People 
Camp Up with People is a 3-week-long sleep-away summer camp in Virginia for ages 13–17 years old. The curriculum has a similar structure to the Up with People touring program, focusing on the arts, leadership, and volunteer service. It also incorporates standard camp activities such as ropes courses. The main notable difference is that the camp occurs only in one U.S. location instead of traveling like the tour program.

Up with People, Jr. 
Up with People, Jr. is a program of Up with People composed of week long summer day camps for ages 8–12 years old. The camps occur in multiple countries such as the United States, Canada, and Belgium. They focus on teaching arts and crafts, international culture, interpersonal skills, and leadership; ultimately ending in a short musical performance by the campers.

Common Beat 
Common Beat is an organization started in Japan by Han Chuson. Chuson traveled as a student in Up with People, took the UWP show ‘A Common Beat’ to Japan, translated it, and performed it there. This grew into the current annual program which has had over 1500 participants since its inception. Common Beat also consistently provides scholarships to Japanese young adults so they may participate in the Up with People program.

Partner organizations

Kiwanis International 
Up with People has a partnership with Kiwanis International (the parent organization of Key Club, Circle K, K-Kids, Builders Club, Aktion Club, and Kiwanis Junior), the international service club that encourages youth to get involved in volunteering and leadership opportunities. Kiwanis states that "Kiwanis clubs can engage with Up with People by coordinating service projects, hosting the cast in their homes and sponsoring performances as fundraisers."

References in culture 
Music critics cite Up with People as a stylistic influence for R.E.M's tongue-in-cheek "Shiny Happy People" and the corresponding music video due to its over-the-top and colorful musical spectacle. The Simpsons parodied the group as "Hooray for Everything," a group of "clean-cut young go-getters," that performs ridiculous songs such as a cover of "Get Dancin" dedicated as a "salute to the Western hemisphere, the greatest hemisphere in the world." The TV show Cheers had a character, Loretta, who sang with the fictional group "The Grinning Americans" (a favorite group of another character, Cliff, and his mother). The creators of The Book of Mormon, a musical that satirizes the latter-day saint movement cited Up with People as an inspiration for the cartoonishly joyous style of several of the songs in their musical performance, which sends up the clean-cut image of Mormon culture.

Notable alumni 

Elizabeth Birch (born September 2, 1956), attorney and former corporate executive who chaired the board of directors of the National Gay and Lesbian Task Force from 1992-1994 and served as the executive director of the Human Rights Campaign, the nation's largest LGBT organization, from January 1995 until January 2004, travelled one year with UWP in her high school years.

Frank Gatson Jr. traveled with Up with People, and he is known for being the creative director for En Vogue, Brandy, Rihanna, Jennifer Lopez, and Beyoncé. He has also choreographed videos, routines and live performances for artists including Michael Jackson, TLC, Kelly Rowland, Fifth Harmony, Destiny's Child, Toni Braxton, and Usher.

Anya Adams is an Up with People alumna and is known for her role as director and assistant director for TV shows Black-ish, The Mindy Project, Community, CSI Miami, and Body of Proof.

NBC News correspondent Tom Costello of The Today Show, NBC Nightly News, MSNBC, and CNBC traveled with Up with People. He is quoted as saying "For me, the gap year was a big year of growing up, and I changed profoundly."

Dutch documentary film director, writer, and photographer Koen Suidgeest traveled in 1988. He is known for his films Karla's Arrival, Casting, Out & About, Solo, and Girl Connected as well as his book Why I Cry on Airplanes and his 2015 TED Talk.

Bermudian singer and actress Candace Furbert traveled in Up with People. She is known for performing in London's West End Theatre and her roles in Book of Mormon, Shrek, Dream Girls, Tina, and more.

Director Jon Lawrence Rivera (who has directed theater performances such as Carla, Moscow, All Soul's Day, Red Hat & Tales, and more) traveled with Up with People in 1981 to 16 states and 13 countries. He was quoted as saying "It was an amazing experience," and "It gave me the feeling that whatever you want to do, you can do."
 
Actress Glenn Close performed with the group in the late 1960s.

Discography

References

External links

 
 Up with People Archive at the University of Arizona Special Collections Library
 Up with People Digital Collection at the University of Arizona Special Collections Library

Civic and political organizations of the United States
Organizations based in Denver
Organizations established in 1965
1965 establishments in Colorado
Non-profit organizations based in Colorado
Youth organizations based in Colorado